The McCoy House, also known as Franklin Town Office or Pendleton County Library, is a historic home located at Franklin, Pendleton County, West Virginia. It was built in 1848, and is a two- to three-story, "L"-shaped, brick building in the Greek Revival-style.  It features a one bay entrance portico with two sets of double Ionic order columns.  A three-story porch is incorporated into the northeastern section.

It was listed on the National Register of Historic Places in 1996.

References

Houses on the National Register of Historic Places in West Virginia
Houses completed in 1848
Houses in Pendleton County, West Virginia
National Register of Historic Places in Pendleton County, West Virginia
Greek Revival houses in West Virginia